Same-sex marriage in Manitoba has been legal since September 16, 2004. In the case of Vogel v. Canada, the Court of Queen's Bench of Manitoba ordered the province to begin issuing marriage licences to same-sex couples. This decision followed a suit brought by three couples who were denied the right to marry. Both the provincial and federal governments had made it known that they would not oppose the court bid.

Manitoba became the fifth jurisdiction in Canada (and the eighth worldwide) to extend civil marriage to same-sex couples, after the provinces of Ontario, British Columbia and Quebec, and the territory of Yukon. The court said that its decision had been influenced by the previous decisions in B.C., Ontario and Quebec.

Court ruling
In 1974, couple Chris Vogel and Richard North married in the First Unitarian Universalist Church in Winnipeg, but the government refused to register their marriage. The couple had previously attempted to receive a civil marriage licence in February 1974, but were rejected. They filed a lawsuit, but the trial court dismissed their case based on dictionary definitions of marriage. The couple received a legal opinion that an appeal was "hopeless". In an October 2004 interview, the couple said "we believed if people would look at us realistically, our problems would end...[Back then] few people could say 'homosexual' without choking [and] we were spoken of as if we were evil."

On August 26, 2004, North and Vogel, along with two other same-sex couples, initiated a lawsuit, Vogel v. Canada, seeking the right to marry in Manitoba. The couples argued that the province's ban on issuing marriage licences to same-sex couples violated the Charter rights of gays and lesbians. Justice Minister Gord Mackintosh said, "We will not oppose what they are seeking....We don't have an interest in opposing legally recognized rights of Canadians.....I think the weight of the decisions across the country have pointed to the conclusion that the current federal law is not in accordance with the Charter, so I am pleased that we're going to have some definitive ruling here in Manitoba." On September 16, 2004, Justice Douglas Yard of the Court of Queen's Bench of Manitoba ordered the province to begin issuing marriage licences to same-sex couples, ruling that the province's same-sex marriage ban violated the Canadian Charter of Rights and Freedoms. Vogel and North did not remarry because they had been married 30 years earlier in the Unitarian Church. The other couples involved in the case were Stefphany Cholakis and Michelle Ritchot, and Laura Fouhse and Jordan Cantwell. Both couples were issued marriage licences following the court order, with Cholakis and Ritchot being the first same-sex couple to marry in Manitoba, on September 16, 2004. Fouhse and Cantwell were married two days later; "I'm extremely pleased that our wedding this weekend will not only be celebrated and witnessed by our friends and family and by God in the sanctity of our church, but it will also be recognized by our government. It just makes the whole event seem so much more complete.", said Fouhse. Both are ministers in the United Church of Canada, with Cantwell serving as Moderator between 2015 and 2018.

James Weisgerber, the Roman Catholic Archbishop of Winnipeg, condemned the court ruling, saying that prohibiting same-sex couples from marrying was "a foundational principle of our society....It is difficult to understand how the unique importance of marriage to both children and society will not be gravely undermined by including in the definition of marriage unions which are not equipped for reproduction." A controversy emerged shortly after the ruling, when the province's Vital Statistics Office sent letters to the province's government marriage commissioners (not clergy) asking them to return their certificates of registration if they refuse to perform same-sex marriages. The federal Conservative justice critic, Vic Toews, announced he would file a complaint with the Manitoba Human Rights Commission if this policy was not rescinded. Kevin Kisilowsky, a marriage commissioner whose certification was cancelled in 2005 when he refused to return his certificate of registration, filed a complaint with the Human Rights Commission, arguing that performing same-sex marriages would violate his religious beliefs, but the Commission dismissed his case in 2005. Kisilowsky filed a legal challenge with the Court of Queen's Bench in September 2016, again arguing that the government's requirement that civil marriage commissioners not discriminate against same-sex couples violated his religious beliefs. Justice Karen Simonsen ruled against him in November 2016, ruling that Kisilowsky "can practice his faith as he chooses but is simply not permitted to use his faith as a basis to refuse to marry couples whose weddings, due to religious or moral views, offend him." Simonsen said Kisilowsky could apply for temporary certification or register as a religious official, which would allow him to perform marriages to whomever he wishes. The Manitoba Court of Appeal upheld Justice Simonsen's decision in February 2018.

In 2015, Richard North filed a discrimination complaint with the Manitoba Human Rights Commission when the government again refused to register his 1974 marriage to Chris Vogel. The Commission referred the case to an adjudicator, who heard the complaint in November 2017. The adjudicator ruled against the couple in January 2018. In June 2021, Justice Gerald Chartier of the Manitoba Court of Queen's Bench agreed with the adjudicator's decision, ruling that the province did not discriminate against the couple by not recognizing their 1974 marriage. The marriage certificate issued to them by the Unitarian Church in 1974 is now on display at the Canadian Museum for Human Rights.

Provincial legislation

Common-law relationships

Since 2001, same-sex couples have had access to government-sanctioned relationships, providing some of the rights and benefits of marriage.

Marriage
In October 2008, the Legislative Assembly of Manitoba amended the Marriage Act and several other acts relating to family law to incorporate gender-neutral language. Specifically, it replaced references to "husband and wife" with "spouses" in various sections of the Act, and added the term "spouse" after "wife/husband" in subsection 7(3). The legislation was assented by Lieutenant Governor John Harvard on October 9, 2008, making Manitoba the fourth province, after Quebec, Ontario and Prince Edward Island, to bring its marriage laws in line with the legalisation of same-sex marriage. Subsection 7(3) was amended to read that each of the parties to the marriage, in the presence of the marriage commissioner and the witnesses, say to the other:

Marriage statistics
Approximately 900 same-sex couples had married in the twelve years following the court ruling. An average of 79 same-sex marriages were performed per year, with the peak being 2014 at 107 same-sex marriages. The 2016 Canadian census showed that 1,710 same-sex couples were living in Manitoba.

Religious performance
In July 2019, the synod of the Anglican Church of Canada passed a resolution known as "A Word to the Church", allowing its dioceses to choose whether to perform same-sex marriages. That same month, Bishop Geoffrey Woodcroft of the Diocese of Rupert's Land said that clergy in the diocese would be permitted to perform same-sex marriages from January 2020.

Bishop William Cliff of the Diocese of Brandon supports same-sex marriage, but has said that he would only allow same-sex marriages to be performed in his diocese with the support of the diocesan synod. Currently, the canons of the diocese state that "no cleric within the jurisdiction of the Diocese of Brandon shall solemnise a marriage between two persons except as provided for in the canons of the General Synod". Bishop Lydia Mamakwa of the Indigenous Spiritual Ministry of Mishamikoweesh, encompassing First Nations communities in northeastern Manitoba, opposes same-sex marriage, and the diocese does not perform same-sex marriages.

See also
Same-sex marriage in Canada
LGBT rights in Canada

Notes

References

External links

LGBT in Manitoba
Manitoba
Politics of Manitoba
Manitoba law
2004 in LGBT history